Marilyn Sides is an American writer and a senior lecturer in the English Department of Wellesley College, Massachusetts where she teaches creative writing and literature courses.

Her collection of short stories, The Island of the Mapmaker's Wife and Other Tales (Harmony), was published in 1996. The title story was selected to appear in the 1990 O. Henry Prize Stories collection and inspired the 2001 British-Dutch feature film The Island of the Mapmaker's Wife by Michie Gleason. Her first novel, The Genius of Affection (Harmony), appeared in 1999.

External links
Wellesley College English Dept.

20th-century American novelists
American women novelists
American women short story writers
Year of birth missing (living people)
Living people
Wellesley College faculty
20th-century American women writers
20th-century American short story writers
Novelists from Massachusetts
American women academics
21st-century American women